Erythras was a port town of ancient Ionia, near Erythrae. Strabo, whose description proceeds from south to north, after describing Teos, says, "before you come to Erythrae, first is Erae, a small city of the Teians, then Corycus, a lofty mountain, and a harbour under it, Casystes; and another harbour called Erythras." 

Its site is tentatively located near the modern Sarpdere Limanı, Asiatic Turkey.

References

Populated places in ancient Ionia
Former populated places in Turkey